Ewan Roberts (29 April 1914–10 January 1983) was a Scottish stage, film and television actor. On stage from 1935, his theatre work included a season with the Old Vic, in 1946-1947. In 1949 he appeared at the Adelphi Theatre in Castle in the Air.

Selected filmography

 London Belongs to Me (1948) - 1st Policeman (uncredited)
 Shadow of the Eagle (1950) - Ship's Doctor
 The Man in the White Suit (1951) - Fotheringay
 Angels One Five (1952) - Medical Officer
 Castle in the Air (1952) - Menzies
 Derby Day (1952) - Studio Driver
 The Crimson Pirate (1952) - Claw Paw
 The Titfield Thunderbolt (1953) - Alec Pearce
 The Heart of the Matter (1953) - Druce (uncredited)
 River Beat (1954) - Customs Insp. J.S. Blake
 The Ladykillers (1955) - Constable (uncredited)
 Port of Escape (1956) - Sergeant Rutherford
 High Tide at Noon (1957) - Fred (uncredited)
 Let's Be Happy (1957) - Hotel Porter
 Night of the Demon (1957) - Lloyd Williamson
 What a Whopper (1961) - Jimmy
 The Traitors (1962) - Col. Burlinson
 The Day of the Triffids (1962) - Dr. Soames
 The Partner (1963) - Inspector Simons
 Five to One (1963) - Deighton
 The Three Lives of Thomasina (1963) - Constable McQuarrie
 Hostile Witness (1968) - Hamish Gillespie
 Country Dance (1970) - Committee Member
 Adolf Hitler - My Part in His Downfall (1973) - Major McDougal
 The Internecine Project (1974) - Lab technician

References

External links
 

1914 births
1983 deaths
British male stage actors
British male film actors
British male television actors
Male actors from Edinburgh
20th-century British male actors